Back to the Door (Spanish: De espaldas a la puerta) is a 1959 Spanish crime film directed by José María Forqué and starring Emma Penella, Amelia Bence and Luis Prendes.

Cast
Emma Penella as Lola  
Amelia Bence as Lidia 
Luis Prendes as Enrique Simón  
Elisa Loti as Patricia  
José María Vilches as Tonio  
José Marco Davó as Barea  
José Luis López Vázquez as Arévalo  
Carlos Mendy as Perico 
Félix Dafauce as Doctor Ponce  
Adriano Domínguez as Fermín  
Mariano Azaña as Alvarito  
 

María del Valle as Amanda  
María Luisa Merlo as Lucky  
Luis Peña as Luis 
 as Luisa

References

External links

1959 crime films
Spanish crime films
Films directed by José María Forqué
1950s Spanish films
1950s Spanish-language films